Valdunciel is a village and municipality in the province of Salamanca,  western Spain, part of the autonomous community of Castile-Leon. As of 2016 it has a population of 95 people.

Geography
It is located 14 kilometers from the provincial capital city of Salamanca and the municipality covers an area of 33 km². It lies 804 meters above sea level.

The postal code is 37798.

References

Municipalities in the Province of Salamanca